Valsesia (Walser German: Tseschrutol) is a group of valleys in the north-east of Piedmont in the Province of Vercelli, Italy; the principal valley is that of the river Sesia.

The major towns located here are Varallo Sesia, Borgosesia and Serravalle Sesia; tourist villages include Alagna Valsesia, Rima San Giuseppe, Carcoforo and Scopello. While the valley mainly belongs to the province of Vercelli three of its comuni, namely Romagnano Sesia, Prato Sesia and Grignasco, are part of the province of Novara.

Business 
There are some industries in the lower towns of Varallo, Borgosesia, Quarona and Serravalle. These are mainly the textile industry and precision engineering companies. Agriculture is also practised here; the wine from Gattinara, which also bears this name, is well known. The higher areas live mainly off of handicrafts and tourism, with both mountain hikers in summer and skiers in winter being addressed. Several stages of the 55-day long-distance hiking trail Grande Traversata delle Alpi run along the north side of the valley. The area around Alagna is developed with lifts, mountain huts and slopes for summer and winter sports.

Summits
Summits that surround the valley include:

 Punta Gnifetti – 
 Punta Parrot – 
 Ludwigshöhe – 
 Corno Nero – 
 Corno Bianco – 
 Monte Tagliaferro –

References